Esther Okhae  (born 12 March 1986) is a Nigerian women's international footballer who plays as a goalkeeper. She is a member of the Nigeria women's national football team. She was part of the team at the 2003 FIFA Women's World Cup.

References

1986 births
Living people
Nigerian women's footballers
Nigeria women's international footballers
Place of birth missing (living people)
2003 FIFA Women's World Cup players
Women's association football goalkeepers